CIAX-FM is a French language community radio station that operates at 98.3 FM in Windsor, Quebec, Canada.

Owned by Carrefour jeunesse emploi-Comté Johnson, the station received CRTC approval in 2000.

References

External links
CIAX-FM

Iax
Iax
Iax
Windsor, Quebec
Radio stations established in 2001
2001 establishments in Quebec